The Australian republic referendum held on 6 November 1999 was a two-question referendum to amend the Constitution of Australia. The first question asked whether Australia should become a republic with a President appointed by Parliament following a bi-partisan appointment model which had been approved by a half-elected, half-appointed Constitutional Convention held in Canberra in February 1998. The second question, generally deemed to be far less important politically, asked whether Australia should alter the Constitution to insert a preamble. For some years opinion polls had suggested that a majority of the electorate favoured a republic. Nonetheless, the republic referendum was defeated, in large part due to division among republicans on the method proposed for selection of the president.

Background

Australia is a constitutional monarchy under the Constitution of Australia adopted in 1901, with the duties of the monarch performed by a Governor-General selected by the Australian Government (although formally appointed by the monarch). Australian republicanism has persisted since colonial times, though through much of the 20th century the monarchy remained popular. In the early 1990s, republicanism became an important political issue. Australian Labor Party Prime Minister Paul Keating indicated a desire to instigate a republic in time for the Centenary of the Federation of Australia in 2001. The opposition Liberal-National Coalition, led by Alexander Downer, though less supportive of the republic plan, promised to convene a Constitutional Convention to discuss the issue. Under John Howard, the Coalition won the 1996 Federal Election and set the Convention date for February 1998.

The 1998 Australian Constitutional Convention debated the need for a change to the Constitution of Australia which would abolish the Australian monarchy. The convention considered three categories of model for the selection of the head of state in an Australian republic: direct election, parliamentary election by a special majority, and appointment by a special council following prime ministerial nomination.

"In principle" agreement was reached by a majority of delegates for an Australian Republic (though a minority bloc of monarchists dissented). Following a series of votes, a proposal for a "Bipartisan Appointment of the President Model" for an Australian republic was endorsed by a majority of delegates who voted for or against the motion (monarchists and some radical-change republicans abstained from the vote). The Convention recommended to the Prime Minister and Parliament of Australia that the model, and other related changes to the Constitution, supported by the convention, be put to the people in a constitutional referendum in 1999.

Division of electorate

The majority of analysis has advanced two main reasons for the referendum defeat:

First, Australians have traditionally been cautious about proposed constitutional change. Beginning in 1906, only eight of 44 proposals put to a referendum, have been approved by the constitutionally required double majority – that is, (1) a majority in each of a majority of the six states and (2) a majority nationally. In Sir Robert Menzies' words, "to get an affirmative vote from the Australian people on a referendum proposal is one of the labours of Hercules."

Second, public opinion varied widely on the issue, and was not a simple positive or negative reaction. The major opinion groups were:
 Traditional monarchists who held their beliefs largely on principled and/or sentimental attachment to the monarchy, in part based on traditional associations with the United Kingdom, the Commonwealth of Nations and a personal identification with Elizabeth II and her family. Many were older or from rural rather than urban areas.
 Pragmatic monarchists who maintained that, whatever the alleged or actual weaknesses of the current system, it also had many alleged or actual strengths. The view of this group was that constitutional monarchy provides the basis for stable democratic government, with the Governor-General (the monarch's nominal representative) acting as an impartial, non-political "umpire" of the political process. Many distrusted the Australian political classes and believed the provision of executive powers to a local politician would result in an undesirably partisan head of state, instability, dictatorship, or a possible repeat of the 1975 Australian constitutional crisis.
 Minimal change republicans who aimed to remove the monarchy, but otherwise maintain the current system as unchanged as possible, thus creating a parliamentary republic. Within this group, there were a small group of supporters of the ultra-minimalist McGarvie Model, but generally the favoured model of these groups was appointment by a two-thirds majority of a joint sitting of Parliament.
 Progressive republicans who wanted a popularly elected head of state.
 Radical republicans who saw the minimal change option as purely cosmetic, and desired comprehensive revision to the current Westminster-based system and possibly the implementation of a presidential or semi-presidential system. This was easily the smallest major group, but prominent in the debate.
 Tactical voters who took a long-term view and voted against their inclinations to avoid more radical changes in the future. Many traditional and pragmatic monarchists perceived a weight of inevitability and voted "Yes" to the minimalist republic to avoid a more radical republic. Many sentimental republicans voted "no" in the hope of a more radical or populist proposal winning a future referendum.
 The uncommitted. As in all elections, a proportion of the electorate remained unattached to either side. Uncommitted 'swinging voters' can be a decisive force in shaping election and referendum results, especially in countries where voting is compulsory.

Alternative methods for selecting a president

The process for change is seen as an important factor for the eventual outcome in a referendum. There were several other proposals for selecting a president:
 Election
 by the federal Parliament alone
 by federal and state Parliaments (as in India)
 by a popular vote (as in Ireland)
 Selection
 by the Prime Minister
 by consensus among the Government and Opposition
 by a constitutional council (known as the McGarvie Model)

Different groups within the republican cause expressed views as to which model was preferable. Some were committed to one option exclusively.

The two sides

The "Yes" side

The "Yes" campaign was headed by Malcolm Turnbull. It was divided in detail but nevertheless managed to present a fairly united and coherent message and was notable for unlikely alliances between traditional opponentsfor example, former Labor Prime Minister Gough Whitlam and former Liberal Prime Minister Malcolm Fraser gave joint statements. Many other prominent Australians also endorsed the "Yes" vote, which led to claims that the movement was "elitist" in sentiment and supported by politicians rather than the public at large. Viewing the case for a republic as fairly self-evident and broadly supported by the Australian populace, their advertising concentrated mainly on the positive symbolism of the republican case. The "Yes" campaign was also viewed as having the support of the popular Australian media by British politician and journalist Bill Deedes who said in The Daily Telegraph in 1999: "I have rarely attended elections in any country, certainly not a democratic one, in which the newspapers have displayed more shameless bias. One and all, they determined that Australians should have a republic and they used every device towards that end."

The "No" side

The organised "No" campaign was a mixture of monarchist groups. Additionally it included some republican groups who did not feel that the proposed model was satisfactory; in particular, they thought that the people should elect the President. Headed by Kerry Jones, the "No" campaign concentrated on the perceived flaws of the model on offer, claiming that those who supported the "Yes" push were "elites" (although many leading figures on the monarchist side also had "elite" backgrounds), and skillfully managing to appeal both to those apprehensive about the change and to those feeling that the model did not go far enough. Their advertising emphasised voting "No" to "this republic", implying to direct-election supporters that a model more to their preferences was likely to be put in the future.

The common elements within the "No" campaign were the view that the model proposed was undemocratic and would lead to a "politician's republic", playing to a general distrust of politicians. "No" campaigners called for further consultation, while remaining non-specific on what steps were needed to ensure this.

Constitutional Convention

The model with an appointed head of state was the one endorsed by the Constitutional Convention and put forward at the referendum. It was broadly supported by both minimalist and establishment republicans, including almost all Labor and some conservative politicians. Progressive republicans in the general community opposed the indirect elected model urging people to vote against the referendum. It was opposed by monarchists of both kinds.

Voting at the convention was open and was recorded in Hansard. Hansard shows that 73 delegates voted in favour, 57 against and 22 abstained. Not one constitutional monarchist delegate voted in favour. The policy of ACM and other monarchist groups was to oppose all republican models, including the minimalist McGarvie model. Some conservatives argued that this would be the easiest model to defeat in a referendum and therefore should be supported at the convention. Had the monarchists followed this advice, the McGarvie model would have prevailed at the convention. A number of republicans who supported direct election abstained from the vote (such as Ted Mack, Phil Cleary, Clem Jones and Andrew Gunter), thereby allowing the bi-partisan model to succeed. They reasoned that the model would be defeated at a referendum, and then a second referendum called with direct election as the model.

Although the motion was passed by ignoring those who abstained, the referendum model did not enjoy the support of the majority of delegates, a condition which the Prime Minister had indicated for a referendum. Because the model was overwhelmingly supported by the republican delegates, the Prime Minister decided to put that model to the referendum, a decision acclaimed by the ARM delegates and the media.

The questions and results

Republic question
Electors were asked whether they approved of:

A proposed law: To alter the Constitution to establish the Commonwealth of Australia as a republic with the Queen and Governor-General being replaced by a President appointed by a two-thirds majority of the members of the Commonwealth Parliament.

Preamble question

Electors were also asked to vote on a second question at the 1999 referendum which asked whether they approved of:

A proposed law: To alter the Constitution to insert a preamble.

The preamble would have been:
With hope in God, the Commonwealth of Australia is constituted as a democracy with a federal system of government to serve the common good.
We the Australian people commit ourselves to this Constitution:
proud that our national unity has been forged by Australians from many ancestries;
never forgetting the sacrifices of all who defended our country and our liberty in time of war;
upholding freedom, tolerance, individual dignity and the rule of law;
honouring Aborigines and Torres Strait Islanders, the nation's first people, for their deep kinship with their lands and for their ancient and continuing cultures which enrich the life of our country;
recognising the nation-building contribution of generations of immigrants;
mindful of our responsibility to protect our unique natural environment;
supportive of achievement as well as equality of opportunity for all;
and valuing independence as dearly as the national spirit which binds us together in both adversity and success.

Results
Section 128 of the Constitution requires a "double majority" in a referendum to approve a constitutional amendmenta majority of votes in each of a majority of the states (i.e. at least four of the six), and a majority of all the electors voting. Voters in the territories count only towards the second of those majorities.

11,785,000 votes were cast, representing a voter turnout of 95.10%. Of these, approximately 100,000 (0.9%) were informal.

The republic
A Proposed Law: To alter the Constitution to establish the Commonwealth of Australia as a republic with the Queen and Governor-General being replaced by a President appointed by a two-thirds majority of the members of the Commonwealth Parliament.

Do you approve this proposed alteration?

The preamble
A Proposed Law: To alter the Constitution to insert a preamble.

Do you approve this proposed alteration?

Analysis of results
Both propositions failed on both of the voting requirements. There was no majority for "Yes" in any state, where the "Yes" vote for the republic ranged from 37.44% in Queensland to 49.84% in Victoria, and for the preamble ranged from 32.81% in Queensland to 42.46% in Victoria. Overall, 54.87% voted "No" to the republic, and 60.66% to the preamble.

The highest "Yes" votes for the republic came from inner metropolitan areas. Of Australia's 148 divisions, 42 voted "Yes", with Melbourne (70.92%), Sydney (67.85%), Melbourne Ports (65.90%), Grayndler (64.77%) and Fraser (64.46%) registering the highest "Yes" votes at division level. Sydney and Melbourne voted in favour of the proposition for Australia to become a republic, in contrast to "No" votes in Adelaide, Brisbane, Gold Coast and Perth. Votes in opposition to the proposal came predominantly from rural and remote divisions, as well as many outer suburban areas. Four of the five divisions recording the highest "No" vote were in Queensland: Maranoa 77.16%, Blair 74.64%, Wide Bay 74.33% and Groom 72.58%. Gwydir in rural New South Wales recorded the fifth-highest vote against the republic, with 72.21%.

Aftermath

With republican models of one form or another winning a majority in opinion polls prior to the referendum, it was expected that the republican referendum would pass. However, the question put was for a particular model of republic with a head of state appointed by Parliament. This was opposed by some supporters of a republic, who preferred a directly elected head of state. Some of these, such as Phil Cleary, advocated that republic supporters vote "No" in order that a future referendum could be put on the directly elected model. Some commentatorsincluding the president of the Australian Republican Movement, Malcolm Turnbullidentified this split within the republican camp as a key reason for the referendum's failure.

After the referendum, Malcolm Turnbull blamed Prime Minister Howard in particular for the defeat and claimed: "Whatever else he achieves, history will remember him for only one thing. He was the Prime Minister who broke a nation's heart." Meanwhile, the leader of Australians for a Constitutional Monarchy, Kerry Jones, called for citizens to accept the result and go forward "as a united nation". Despite the hopes of more radical republicans such as Phil Cleary, the referendum defeat was generally viewed as a setback for the republican cause and further referendums on the subject were mooted by the Howard government.

High Court Justice Michael Kirby, a constitutional monarchist, ascribed the failure of the republic referendum to ten factors: lack of bi-partisanship; undue haste; a perception that the republic was supported by big city elites; a "denigration" of monarchists as "unpatriotic" by republicans; the adoption of an inflexible republican model by the convention; concerns about the specific model proposed (chiefly the ease with which a Prime Minister could dismiss a president); a republican strategy of using big "names" attached to the Whitlam era to promote their cause; strong opposition to the proposal in the smaller states; a counter-productive pro-republican bias in the media; and an instinctive caution among the Australian electorate regarding Constitutional change.

The Gillard Labor government which took power in a hung parliament following the August 2010 election indicated an intention not to revisit the issue of a vote for an Australian republic during the reign of Queen Elizabeth II. The Liberal-National Coalition government in power following the September 2013 federal election was led by Tony Abbott, a supporter of constitutional monarchy. During Abbott's term as Prime Minister, Labor Opposition Leader Bill Shorten stated he believed it was time to "breathe new life into the dream of an Australian republic".

On 15 September 2015, Malcolm Turnbull, who had been Chairman of the Australian Republican Movement from 1993 until 2000, succeeded Tony Abbott as leader of the Liberal Party, to become the Prime Minister of Australia. For the first time, the Prime Minister and the federal Opposition Leader, as well as the eight state and territory Premiers and Chief Ministers, were all self-declared republicans. Turnbull has stated that he believes Australia should become a republic after the reign of Queen Elizabeth II. Turnbull was later succeeded, on 24 August 2018, by Scott Morrison, who subsequently declared himself a constitutional monarchist, and re-hung a portrait of the Queen in the Prime Minister's office, which Turnbull had removed. Anthony Albanese who was sworn in as Prime Minister in May 2022 is a convinced Republican but ruled ot to organise a referendum during his fort term in office after the death of Queen Elizabeth II as a sign of respect for the late queen.

See also
 Republicanism in Australia
 Monarchy of Australia
 1980 Quebec referendum
 1995 Quebec referendum
 1995 Bermudian independence referendum
 2002 Gibraltar sovereignty referendum
 2008 Tuvaluan constitutional referendum
 2009 Saint Vincent and the Grenadines constitutional referendum
 2013 Falkland Islands sovereignty referendum
 2014 Scottish independence referendum
 2015–2016 New Zealand flag referendums
 2016 United Kingdom European Union membership referendum

References

External links
Australian Electoral Commission (AEC)
Referendums
1999 Referendum Report and Statistics
Key results
Summary of Results – Republic
Summary of Results – Preamble
Electoral Newsfile No. 87: Referendum 1999 – Results Guide (1999-December)
George Williams, 'Removing racism from Australia's constitutional DNA' (2012) 37(3) Alternative Law Journal 151

Referendum,1999
1999 referendums
Republic referendum
1999 in international relations
Republic,1999
Sovereignty referendums
Howard Government
Monarchy referendums
Republic referendum
Republic referendum,1999